"GoldenEye" is a song written by Irish musicians Bono and the Edge and performed by American singer Tina Turner. The song served as the theme for the James Bond film of the same name. Released as a single on November 6, 1995, the track was a chart hit in Europe, topping the Hungarian Singles Chart and reaching the top five in Austria, Finland, France, Italy, and Switzerland. It was less successful outside the continent, reaching number 43 in Canada, number 63 in Australia, and number two on the  US Billboard Bubbling Under Hot 100.

Background and release
The song was written by Bono and the Edge of Irish rock band U2 for Tina Turner, after they learned that she had been invited to sing the theme song to the upcoming James Bond movie (Depeche Mode had initially been approached in 1994 but were coming to the end of their Devotional tour and could not meet the schedule). The track was produced and mixed by British producer/remixer/composer Nellee Hooper, best known for his work with Massive Attack, Madonna, U2 and Björk. The track reached number ten on the UK Singles Chart and became a top-five hit in several European countries.

"GoldenEye" was first released on the original motion picture soundtrack and the following year it was included on Turner's album Wildest Dreams. The song has been covered by Nicole Scherzinger for the 2010 remake of the GoldenEye 007 video game.

Critical reception
Larry Flick from Billboard described "GoldenEye" as a "gloriously over-the-top James Bond theme" and a "tingly, feline performance" by Turner. He found that producer Nellee Hooper "captures the essence of the movie, wrapping the track in sweeping strings and horns that are fondly reminiscent" of the 1964 movie Goldfinger, and added that U2's Bono and the Edge "get in on the fun, writing a tune that's fraught with cryptic lyrical twists and romantic intrigue." James Masterton for Dotmusic said that "like most Bond themes it tends towards the sweeping style of the early John Barry efforts yet still manages to retain its own identity." Nisid Hajari from Entertainment Weekly stated that the James Bond myth "certainly allows for the trinity of Sex, Danger, and Elegance to verge on melodrama." He noted the song's "self-conscious vocals and maudlin horns and strings", that "blithely crosses the line". 

A reviewer from Liverpool Echo commented that Turner "manages to sound like Shirley Bassey". David Cook from The Michigan Daily wrote that "it's amazing how similar this song sounds to other opening songs from previous James Bond movies — there must be some magic formula to making all of the sound so Bondlike." Pan-European magazine Music & Media deemed it a "perfect candidate" for the soundtrack of 007's "latest adventure", stating that Turner "and her raw R&B power easily fit in the Shirley Bassey tradition." They also noted that the composers "stayed close to the traditional James Bond sound". Music Week rated the song five out of five, writing that the singer's voice "soars above a swirling orchestra in this powerful single with a classic Bond feel." Jeff Farance from The News-Journal, while reviewing the movie, said that the title sequence is "pure Bond, with Tina Turner belting out the title song in the grand tradition of magnificent music for 007."

Music video
The accompanying music video for "GoldenEye" was directed by English film director Jake Scott and made its debut at the end of October 1995. It features Sudanese model Alek Wek.

Charts

Weekly charts

Year-end charts

Certifications and sales

Release history

Alternate rejected theme song
Like many Bond themes before it, Tina Turner's version was not the only recorded song for the film. Swedish pop band Ace of Base also recorded a song that was optioned to the studio. Ace of Base's "The GoldenEye" was later reworked into "The Juvenile" which appeared on their Da Capo album in 2002.

Samples and covers
 In 1999, French rapper Kohndo has sampled parts of the instrumentals in his song "Survivre".
 In 2008, Lil Mass, another French rapper, sampled it in the song "Beatdown".
 The song appeared in an episode of MTV series Human Giant and again in the 2010 film Beatdown.
 American singer Nicole Scherzinger, lead singer of pop group Pussycat Dolls, covered the single for the 2010 remake of the video game GoldenEye 007. The song plays during the game's introduction.
 Finnish alternative rock band End of You covered the song for their 2008 album Mimesis.
 Prominent DJ David Morales has performed a club remix of the song, while record producer Dave Hall has provided a more urban flavour on his remix, both versions were included on the European four-track CD single.

See also
 James Bond music
 Outline of James Bond

References

External links
 

Songs from James Bond films
Tina Turner songs
Nicole Scherzinger songs
1995 songs
Song
Songs written by Bono
Songs written by the Edge
Song recordings produced by Nellee Hooper
Music videos directed by Jake Scott (director)
Number-one singles in Hungary
Parlophone singles
Virgin Records singles